Adarakatti  is a village in the southern state of Karnataka, India. It is located in the Shirhatti taluk of Gadag district in Karnataka. Adarakatti is about one mile from Laxmeshwar. laxmeshwar is the closest commercial town.

See also
 Gadag
 Districts of Karnataka

References

External links
 https://web.archive.org/web/20100110220239/http://adarakatti.com/

Villages in Gadag district